Telford and Wrekin is a borough and unitary authority in Shropshire, England. In 1974, a non-metropolitan district of Shropshire was created called The Wrekin, named after a prominent hill to the west of Telford. In 1998, the district became a unitary authority and was renamed "Telford and Wrekin", which remains part of the Shropshire ceremonial county and shares institutions such as the Fire and Rescue Service and Community Health with the rest the county. 

The borough's major settlement is Telford, which was designated a "new town" in the 1960s and incorporated the towns of Dawley, Madeley, Oakengates, and Wellington. After the Telford conurbation, which includes the aforementioned towns, the next-largest settlement is Newport which is located in the northeast of the borough and is not part of the original new town of Telford.
The borough borders Staffordshire, but is surrounded by the unitary district of Shropshire which covers the area previously administrated by Shropshire County Council.

History
The district was created on 1 April 1974 under the Local Government Act 1972 covering the area of five former districts, plus a small part of a sixth:
Dawley Urban District
Newport Urban District
Oakengates Urban District
Wellington Rural District
Wellington Urban District
From Shifnal Rural District, the part of the parish of Shifnal within the designated area of Telford New Town (which was added to the parish of Lilleshall)

The district was initially called "Wrekin", but during 1974 the council changed the name to "The Wrekin". A significant part of the new district was within the designated area of the Telford New Town, which had been initially designated in 1963 as Dawley New Town before being enlarged and renamed to Telford in 1968. The Telford Development Corporation existed alongside the elected councils until it was wound up in 1991, running various functions such as town planning which would otherwise have been council responsibilities.

On 1 April 1998, as a result of the Local Government Commission for England's review, the district became a unitary authority, independent from Shropshire County Council. On the same day the district's name was changed from "The Wrekin" to "Telford and Wrekin".

All of the council houses previously owned by Wrekin District Council and the subsequent Telford and Wrekin Council were transferred to a newly created housing association, the Wrekin Housing Trust, in 1999 which now owns the majority of social housing in Telford.

Telford and Wrekin applied unsuccessfully for city status in 2000. The district was granted borough status in 2002.

Towns, villages and other settlements

Settlements in Telford and Wrekin -

 Coalbrookdale
 Crudgington
 Edgmond
 Great Bolas
 High Ercall
 Ironbridge 
 Jackfield
 Lilleshall
 Little Wenlock
 Newport (town)
 Church Aston
 Longford
 Roden
 Telford (new town)
 Dawley (town)
 Donnington
 Donnington Wood
 Hadley
 Ketley
 Lawley
 Madeley (town)
 Muxton
 Oakengates (town)
 Shawbirch
 Priorslee
 Stirchley
 St George's
 Trench
 Wellington (town)
 Sambrook, Shropshire
 Tibberton
 Waters Upton
 Wrockwardine

Divisions

Parishes
The borough is divided into 29 civil parishes.

List of parishes

Wards
For the borough council itself there is a system of thirty wards to elect councillors.

 List of wards at Telford and Wrekin website
 Current ward councillors  at Telford and Wrekin website

Election history
Borough elections are held every 4 years.

 Previous Election Results

Governance 

Telford and Wrekin operates a cabinet-style council. It has 54 elected councillors who appoint the seven cabinet members, including the leader, each year. The cabinet members make decisions as a whole and meet every two weeks.

Telford and Wrekin is currently a Labour controlled council.

Policing 
Telford and Wrekin is part of the West Mercia Police police area. The force is based in Worcester (outside Shropshire) and the borough's area is a Territorial Policing Unit in the force's organisation.

Economy
 
This is a chart of trend of regional gross value added of Telford and Wrekin at current basic prices published (pp. 240–253) by Office for National Statistics with figures in millions of British pounds sterling.

Freedom of the Borough
The following People and Military Units and Organisations and Groups have received the Freedom of the Borough of Telford and Wrekin.

Individuals
 Mrs. Iris Butler: 2002.
 Mr. Richie Woodhall: 2002
 Mr. Lee Carter: 2005.
 Mrs. Elizabeth Holt: 2008.
 Mr. Peter Gibbons: 2009.
 Mr. George Whyle: 2011.
 Corporal Ricky Fergusson : 2012.
 Mickey Bushell : 2014.
 Mr. Alan Olver: 2015.
 Mr. John Alfred David Gill: 2017.
 Mr. Liam Davies: 2023

Military Units
 The Rifles: 29 May 2010.

Organisations and Groups
 Telford Crisis Support: 11 June 2022.

See also
 Telford and Wrekin local elections
 The Wrekin – prominent hill to the west of Telford
 1990s UK local government reform
 Shropshire Council – the other unitary authority in Shropshire
 Healthcare in Shropshire

References

External links
 Telford & Wrekin Council

 
Local government districts of Shropshire
Unitary authority districts of England
NUTS 3 statistical regions of the United Kingdom
Boroughs in England